Shamera Sterling (born 21 October 1995) is a Jamaican netball player. She was part of the Jamaican squad that won bronze at the 2018 Commonwealth Games. Earlier that year she was signed by Loughborough Lightning in the Netball Superleague. After a brief stint at Loughborough, she moved to the Adelaide Thunderbirds in the Australian Super Netball league in the 2019 season.

References

External links
 

1995 births
Living people
Jamaican netball players
Place of birth missing (living people)
Adelaide Thunderbirds players
Netball players at the 2018 Commonwealth Games
Commonwealth Games bronze medallists for Jamaica
Commonwealth Games medallists in netball
2019 Netball World Cup players
Jamaican expatriate netball people in Australia
Jamaican expatriate netball people in England
Loughborough Lightning netball players
Suncorp Super Netball players
Netball Superleague players
People from Saint James Parish, Jamaica
Medallists at the 2018 Commonwealth Games
Medallists at the 2022 Commonwealth Games